Dick Gordon may refer to:

Dick Gordon (American football) (born 1944), American football player
Dick Gordon (politician) (born 1945), Filipino politician, civil servant and journalist
Dick Gordon (sports writer) (1911–2008), American sports writer
Dick Gordon, host of the radio series The Story with Dick Gordon

See also
Richard Gordon (disambiguation)